Stone Mill may refer to:
 Stone Mill, New Jersey, a community also known as Readingsburg
 Stone Mill (Middlebury, Vermont), a building listed on the NRHP
 Old Stone Mill (Newport, Rhode Island), a community also known as Newport Tower

 Dunham's Mill, also known as the Stone Mill in Clinton, New Jersey
 Lillian and Amy Goldman Stone Mill, building in New York City
 Stone Mills, a township in Ontario, Canada